Justin Matthew Krueger (born 6 October 1986) is a German-Canadian professional ice hockey defenceman who is currently playing with Lausanne HC of the National League (NL). He previously played for SC Bern and for the Charlotte Checkers, the AHL affiliate of the Carolina Hurricanes. He was selected by the Carolina Hurricanes in the 7th round (213th overall) of the 2006 NHL Entry Draft.

Playing career
Krueger began his ice hockey career at Duisburger SV in Germany, where his father Ralph Krueger had his first stint as a coach in 1989. After his father had signed with the Austrian club VEU Feldkirch in 1991, he continued his career in the Feldkirch youth setup. He then joined the HC Davos junior team, after his father had been named head coach of the Swiss men's national team.

In 2004, Justin recorded 17 points (five goals, 12 assists) in 38 games for HC Davos in the Swiss Junior League. Krueger moved after one year from Davos to North America and signed with the Penticton Vees of the BCHL. After this season he was named the Best Conditioned Athlete by the Penticton Vees and was drafted in the seventh round, 213th overall, by the Carolina Hurricanes in the 2006 NHL Entry Draft. He was then recruited to play collegiate hockey, joining the Cornell Big Red as a freshman in 2006. In his final season at Cornell (2009–10), Krueger was named ECAC Hockey Defensive Defenseman of the Year.

Krueger played for the SC Bern team in the 2010–11 season, and began playing in North America within the Carolina Hurricanes' farm system for the 2011–12 season. After two years in the American Hockey League, he returned to SC Bern on a two-year deal in May 2013 and in November 2014 had his contract extended through the 2017–18 season. He won the Swiss championship with SCB in 2016 and 2017.

On June 2, 2020, Krueger joined Lausanne HC on a one-year deal.

International play

Krueger landed a spot on the roster of the German under-18 Men's National Team in 2003 and represented Germany at the 2004 under-18 and 2005 under-20 World Championships. At the 2005 tournament, he served as captain of the German squad.

He first tried out for the German Men's National Team before the 2009 Deutschland Cup held in Munich, Germany, but did not play for that tournament. He was chosen to play for Team Germany for the first time in April 2010 and then participated in the 2010 IIHF World Championship in Germany. In October 2018, he retired from the German men's national team. He received 99 caps during his international career, representing Team Germany at seven World Championships.

Personal life
Krueger is the son of former Buffalo Sabres head coach Ralph Krueger. In 2010, he earned a bachelor's degree in hotel management at Cornell University. His paternal grandparents emigrated to Canada from Germany in 1952.

Career statistics

Regular season and playoffs

International

Awards and honors

References

External links
 

1986 births
Living people
SC Bern players
Carolina Hurricanes draft picks
Charlotte Checkers (2010–) players
Cornell Big Red men's ice hockey players
Cornell University School of Hotel Administration alumni
German expatriate sportspeople in Switzerland
German expatriates in the United States
German ice hockey defencemen
German people of Canadian descent
Lausanne HC players
Penticton Vees players
Sportspeople from Düsseldorf